Sir William Heathcote, 5th Baronet, PC (17 May 1801 – 17 August 1881), was a British landowner and Conservative politician.

Background and education
Heathcote was the son of Reverend William Heathcote, second son of Sir William Heathcote, 3rd Baronet. His mother was Elizabeth, daughter of Lovelace Bigg-Wither. He was educated at Winchester and Oriel College, Oxford. In 1825 he succeeded his uncle as fifth Baronet of Hursley as well as to the family seat of Hursley House, Hursley, Hampshire.

Political career
Heathcote entered Parliament as one of two representatives (MPs) for Hampshire in 1826, a seat he held until 1831, and in the previous year described by commentators as among those voting with the group known as Ultra-Tories. He was re-elected next as MP for Hampshire North between 1837 and 1849 and for Oxford University between 1854 and 1868. He never held ministerial office but was sworn of the Privy Council in 1870. He was High Sheriff of Hampshire for 1832–33.

Heathcote was a member of the Canterbury Association from 27 March 1848.

Family
Heathcote was twice married. He married firstly the Hon. Caroline Frances, daughter of Charles Perceval, 2nd Baron Arden, in 1825. They had three sons and one daughter. After her death in March 1835 he married secondly Selina, daughter of Evelyn Shirley, in 1841. They had eight children. Heathcote died in August 1881, aged 80, and was succeeded in the baronetcy by his eldest son from his first marriage, William. Lady Selina Heathcote died in July 1901, having sold Hursley House to Joseph William Baxendale, of the Pickfords logistics company.

References

Biography at family-forest.co.uk

External links 

1801 births
1881 deaths
Alumni of Oriel College, Oxford
Baronets in the Baronetage of Great Britain
William
Conservative Party (UK) MPs for English constituencies
UK MPs 1826–1830
UK MPs 1830–1831
UK MPs 1837–1841
UK MPs 1841–1847
UK MPs 1847–1852
Members of the Parliament of the United Kingdom for the University of Oxford
UK MPs 1852–1857
UK MPs 1857–1859
UK MPs 1859–1865
UK MPs 1865–1868
Members of the Canterbury Association
High Sheriffs of Hampshire
Ultra-Tory MPs
Members of the Privy Council of the United Kingdom